Stephen Christopher Tepper (born March 10, 1969) is a former professional ice hockey right wing. He was drafted in the seventh round, 134th overall, by the Chicago Blackhawks in the 1987 NHL Entry Draft. After playing four seasons at the University of Maine, Tepper played one game in the National Hockey League with the Blackhawks during the 1992–93 season, getting hit directly in the face with a shot, and going scoreless.

He now coaches for the Northstar Youth Hockey Program in Westboro, MA.

See also
List of players who played only one game in the NHL

External links

1969 births
American men's ice hockey right wingers
Cape Breton Oilers players
Chicago Blackhawks draft picks
Chicago Blackhawks players
Fort Worth Fire players
Ice hockey players from California
Indianapolis Ice players
Kansas City Blades players
Living people
Maine Black Bears men's ice hockey players
Roanoke Express players
Sportspeople from Santa Ana, California